I Was a Rat is a children's drama television series broadcast on BBC One from 9 to 23 December 2001, based on the popular 1999 children's novel I Was a Rat! or The Scarlet Slippers by Philip Pullman. It was aired in the Sunday tea-time slot which traditionally accommodates a children's drama series in the run-up to Christmas. The series was produced by Andy Rowley and starred Calum Worthy in the leading role, alongside Tom Conti and Brenda Fricker. It was adapted by Richard Carpenter, who won a BAFTA award for the work.

Synopsis
The series is set in the early 1920s, telling the tale of a young boy with a mysterious past who claims to be a rat. He is taken in off the streets by elderly couple Bob (Conti) and Joan (Fricker) who name him Roger and it soon becomes obvious that he is no ordinary child.

Cast and characters
 Calum Worthy as Roger/Ratty
 Brenda Fricker as Joan Jones
 Tom Conti as Bob Jones
 Ned Beatty as Mudduck
 Stephen Ouimette as Wheedle
 Katie Blake as Lady Aurelia Ashington/Mary Jane Potts
 James Millard as Prince Richard
 Karl Pruner as Julian
 Richard Graham as Charlie
 Denis Lill as Sergeant Piggles
 Don McKellar as Oliver Tapscrew

References

External links
 

2001 British television series debuts
2001 British television series endings
2000s British children's television series
2000s British drama television series
2001 Canadian television series debuts
2001 Canadian television series endings
2000s Canadian children's television series
2000s Canadian drama television series
BBC children's television shows
BBC television dramas
British children's fantasy television series
Canadian children's fantasy television series
Television shows based on British novels
English-language television shows